National records in athletics are the marks achieved by a nation's best athlete or athletes in a particular athletics event. These records are ratified by the respective national athletics governing body. A national record may also be the respective continental record (also called "area record", or even the world record (WR) in that event.

Record lists
The following articles list records for particular nations:

 Afghanistan
 Albania
 Algeria
 American Samoa
 Andorra
 Angola
 Anguilla
 Antigua and Barbuda
 Argentina
 Armenia
 Aruba
 Australia
 Austria
 Azerbaijan
 Bahamas
 Bahrain
 Bangladesh
 Barbados
 Belarus
 Belgium
 Belize
 Benin
 Bermuda
 Bhutan
 Bolivia
 Bosnia and Herzegovina
 Botswana
 Brazil
 British Virgin Islands
 Brunei
 Bulgaria
 Burkina Faso
 Burundi
 Cambodia
 Cameroon
 Canada
 Cape Verde
 Cayman Islands
 Central African Republic
 Chad
 Chile
 China
 Taiwan
 Colombia
 Comoros
 Democratic Republic of the Congo
 Republic of the Congo
 Cook Islands
 Costa Rica
 Croatia
 Cuba
 Cyprus
 Czech Republic
 Denmark
 Djibouti
 Dominica
 Dominican Republic
 East Timor
 Ecuador
 Egypt
 El Salvador
 Equatorial Guinea
 Eritrea
 Estonia
 Ethiopia
 Federated States of Micronesia
 Fiji
 Finland
 France
 French Polynesia
 Gabon
 Gambia
 Georgia
 Germany
 Ghana
 Gibraltar
 Greece
 Grenada
 Guam
 Guatemala
 Guinea
 Guinea-Bissau
 Guyana
 Haiti
 Honduras
 Hong Kong
 Hungary
 Iceland
 India
 Indonesia
 Iran
 Iraq
 Ireland
 Israel
 Italy
 Ivory Coast
 Jamaica
 Japan
 Jordan
 Kazakhstan
 Kenya
 Kiribati
 North Korea
 South Korea
 Kosovo
 Kyrgyzstan
 Kuwait
 Laos
 Latvia
 Lebanon
 Lesotho
 Liberia
 Libya
 Liechtenstein
 Lithuania
 Luxembourg
 Macau
 Madagascar
 Malawi
 Malaysia
 Maldives
 Mali
 Malta
 Marshall Islands
 Mauritania
 Mauritius
 Mexico
 Moldova
 Monaco
 Mongolia
 Montenegro
 Montserrat
 Morocco
 Mozambique
 Myanmar
 Namibia
 Nauru
 Nepal
 Netherlands
 Netherlands Antilles (Former member of IAAF)
 New Caledonia
 New Zealand
 Nicaragua
 Niger
 Nigeria
 Niue
 Norfolk Island
 Northern Mariana Islands
 North Macedonia
 Norway
 Oman
 Pakistan
 Palau
 Palestine
 Panama
 Papua New Guinea
 Paraguay
 Peru
 Philippines
 Poland
 Portugal
 Puerto Rico
 Qatar
 Romania
 Russia
 Rwanda
 Saint Kitts and Nevis
 Saint Lucia
 Saint Vincent and the Grenadines
 Samoa
 San Marino
 São Tomé and Príncipe
 Saudi Arabia
 Senegal
 Serbia
 Seychelles
 Sierra Leone
 Singapore
 Slovakia
 Slovenia
 Solomon Islands
 Somalia
 South Africa
 South Sudan
 Spain
 Sri Lanka
 Sudan
 Suriname
 Eswatini
 Sweden
 Switzerland
 Syria
 Tajikistan
 Tanzania
 Thailand
 Togo
 Tonga
 Trinidad and Tobago
 Tunisia
 Turkey
 Turkmenistan
 Turks and Caicos Islands
 Tuvalu
 Uganda
 Ukraine
 United Arab Emirates
 United Kingdom
 United States
 United States Virgin Islands
 Uruguay
 Uzbekistan
 Vanuatu
 Venezuela
 Vietnam
 Yemen
 Zambia
 Zimbabwe

See also

National records in the marathon